Nothabraxas is a genus of moths in the family Geometridae, known for their distinctive diamond shaped markings.

References

Geometridae